Opernball (Opera Ball) is a 1998 made-for-TV movie by Urs Egger based on a 1995 novel by Austrian writer Josef Haslinger in which thousands of people are killed in a Neo-Nazi terrorist attack taking place during the Vienna Opera Ball. The film starred Heiner Lauterbach, Franka Potente, Frank Giering, Caroline Goodall, Richard Bohringer, Gudrun Landgrebe and Désirée Nosbusch.

External links

1998 films
1998 television films
1998 thriller films
Austrian television films
Austrian thriller films
German television films
German thriller films
1990s German-language films
German-language television shows
Films based on Austrian novels
Television shows based on novels
Sat.1 original programming
Thriller television films
1990s German films
Films about neo-Nazism